Level Best is a compilation album featuring the most successful singles by the English band Level 42. It was released at the end of 1989, marking a decade since the band's beginnings.

Track listing 
"Running in the Family" (3:57) (from Running in the Family)
"The Sun Goes Down (Living It Up)" (3:35) (from Standing in the Light)
"Something About You" (3:44) (from World Machine)
"Tracie" (3:22) (from Staring at the Sun)
"Starchild' (3:52) (from Level 42)
"It's Over" (4:42) (from Running in the Family)
"Hot Water" (3:39) (from True Colours)
"Take Care of Yourself" (4:28) (new song)
"Heaven in My Hands" (4:09) (from Staring at the Sun)
"Children Say" (4:28) (from Running in the Family)
"Love Games" (4:32) (from Level 42)
"The Chinese Way" (3:57) (from The Pursuit of Accidents)
"Leaving Me Now" (3:31) (from World Machine)
"Lessons in Love" (4:00) (from Running in the Family)
"Micro-kid" (3:47) (from Standing in the Light)
"Take a Look" (4:41) (from Staring at the Sun)
"To Be With You Again" (3:55) (from Running in the Family)
"The Chant Has Begun" (4:17) (from True Colours)

Personnel
Mark King – vocals, bass
Mike Lindup – keyboards, vocals
Boon Gould – guitars (tracks 1–3, 5–7, 10–15, 17, 18)
Phil Gould – drums (tracks 1–3, 5–7, 10–15, 17, 18)
Gary Husband – drums (tracks 4, 8, 9, 16)
Alan Murphy – guitars (tracks 4, 8, 9, 16)
Wally Badarou – keyboards

Charts

Weekly charts

Year-end charts

Sales and certifications

References

Level 42 albums
Albums produced by Mike Vernon (record producer)
Albums produced by Wally Badarou
1989 greatest hits albums
Polydor Records compilation albums